Extremefilmmaker's 48 Hour Film Festival was a film festival in Los Angeles where filmmakers shot and edited movies in 48 hours.  (They are permitted to write the movies beforehand.)

History
What became the Extreme Filmmaker 48 Hour Film Festival began with a small group of friends who worked at a small visual effects company in Hollywood. They would sit around during their breaks and talk about making movies, but none of them actually got around to doing it. They challenged each other to a contest to see who could make the best movie in 48 hours... the goal being to get them to actually start doing what they had been talking about for years... making movies.  Originally called simply "The 48 Hour Film Festival," the first showing in the upstairs office of the effects company contained only seven movies.

With the second festival, friends of the original filmmakers were also involved in making films and the screening was moved to a larger screening room at a post production facility. After that, Mark Kochinski, who had done much of the work of setting up the festivals joined with his long-time buddies Keith Matz and John Parenteau and took the project public, allowing filmmakers from around the world to enter.

Later known as the "Extreme Filmmaker 48 Hour Film Festival"  (to separate it from other similar projects), the first major screening was held at the Chaplin Theater at Raleigh Studios, a 150-seat venue that soon proved to small for the growing audience. The festival received thousands of entries and the select movies chosen by the festival's organizers were showcased in a gala premier held at the Arclight Theater on Sunset Blvd. Two awards for Best Film were given out, one by the festival's organizers and one voted on by the audience. For a time all proceeds raised went to the Starbright Foundation.  In addition to being screened on the big screen, all chosen films were also showcased on the official web site of the festival,

Rules and Resources
The rules were:
All shooting and editing must be completed within a 48-hour time period.
The time limit is eight minutes, though certain exceptions are made.
The content cannot be considered deserving of a hard R or NC-17 or XXX rating.

The 48 hour time limit did not apply to pre-production efforts such as screenwriting, casting and set design. The ExtremeFilmmaker web site also contained information for those who had the idea to make a great movie, but maybe lacked the technical knowledge. Other information found on the site included guides for picking the right editing equipment and software, as well as tips on the actual process of making a movie; for instance, such things as framing, lighting, and using the camera itself as an actor were covered.

List of past award winners
'Staged, Raged, & Engaged' by Craig Kuehne 
'Beaux & Daria' by Chris Bosen & Maryellen Owens 
'Atkins Angels' by Joshua Rous 
'Hattie Needs Rehab' by Paul C. Anderson 
'Shhh! It's Love' by Elizabeth Thompson & Nathan White 
'Mating Season' by Greg Benson 
'Friendly Advice' by Leander Rappman & India Dupre 
'Missed Connection' by Paula Rhodes

References

External links
 ExtremeFilmmaker
 The Original Films

Film festivals in Los Angeles
Short film festivals in the United States